Burchard (and all variant spellings) may refer to:


People
 Burchard (name), Burchard and all related spellings as a given name and surname
 Burckhardt, or (de) Bourcard, a family of the Basel patriciate
 Burchard-Bélaváry family, an aristocratic family of Hungarian origin, originally called Both de Szikava et Bélavár

Places in the United States
 Burchard, Minnesota
 Burchard, Nebraska
 Burkhardt, Wisconsin

Other uses
 Burckhardt (crater), a lunar impact crater
 Burkhardt (grape) (also Burkhardt's Prince), a French red wine grape better known as Aramon
 Burckhardt Compression, Swiss compression technology enterprise